CUCN or China-US Cable Network was a submarine telecommunications cable linking several countries in the Asia-Pacific region. It was retired from service in December 2016.

It has landing points in:
Shantou, Guangdong Province, China
Fangshan, Pingtung County, Taiwan
Chongming, Shanghai, China
Okinawa Prefecture, Japan
Pusan, South Korea
Chikura, Chiba Prefecture, Japan
Tanguisson Point, Tamuning Village, Guam (unincorporated territory of the United States)
Bandon, Coos County, Oregon, United States
San Luis Obispo, San Luis Obispo County, California, United States

External links
 
 
 
 

Submarine communications cables in the Pacific Ocean
1999 establishments in Asia
1999 establishments in Guam
1999 establishments in California
1999 establishments in Oregon